The Vigil is a 2019 American supernatural horror film written and directed by Keith Thomas in his feature directorial debut. Jason Blum serves as an executive producer through his Blumhouse Productions banner.

The Vigil premiered at the 2019 Toronto International Film Festival on September 9, 2019. The film received a limited theatrical release in the United Kingdom, Ireland, and New Zealand in July 2020, before being released internationally on August 5, 2020. It was released in the United States on February 26, 2021 by IFC Midnight.

Plot 
The film opens with an unidentified boy forced by a man in a black Nazi uniform to shoot a young woman in a forest, as a strange figure approaches them in the background.

The film then cuts to Yakov Ronen, a man who has left the Orthodox Jewish community in  Brooklyn. He is struggling to deal with an unspecified traumatic event in his past and to pay his rent due to not having a job. He is approached by Reb Shulem, a member of his former Orthodox Jewish community, to keep vigil over Rubin Litvak, a Holocaust survivor who had died recently. Shulem had previously hired a Shomer, but that individual had left due to being "afraid", and Ronen had prior experience with keeping vigil. Ronen accepts the job after negotiating a higher fee. That night, Ronen and Shulem meet with Litvak's widow, who is suffering from Alzheimer's disease and reluctantly accepts Ronen as a Shomer, and Shulem informs Ronen that the mortuary men will arrive in five hours.

Ronen begins his vigil then he starts to hear strange noises and sees a shadowy figure in the house's dining room. He finds a photo of Litvak and his family with a similar shadowy figure behind them, before briefly going to sleep; he has a nightmare about his younger brother being tormented by some older men. Upon waking up, Ronen experiences additional strange events, such as the lights flickering while texting his friend Sarah, and finds a video on his phone sent by an unknown number. The video shows Mrs. Litvak approaching Ronen and touching his face while he is asleep; the video file vanishes from his phone a few seconds later.

Ronen has a conversation with Mrs. Litvak, who explains that she drove their children away. Ronen then finds a television in the basement, playing a video recording of Litvak and his wife. The Mazzik appears behind Ronen, and he flees from the basement. Ronen gets a call apparently from his physician, Dr. Kohlberg, and from his dead brother, who asks: "Why did you let me die?"

Ronen leaves the house to get Shulem, though Mrs. Litvak warns him that he has been in the house for too long. However, Ronen experiences cracking bones while walking down the street, and is confronted by the Mazzik. Ronen hastily returns to the house, and falls down the steps after being startled by the Mazzik appearing in front of the door. A flashback then reveals that Ronen's brother was killed in a car accident after escaping from the men who were tormenting him, and Ronen has felt guilty about his death ever since.

With Mrs. Litvak's assistance, Ronen confronts the Mazzik, which has shapeshifted its true face to look like Ronen's. After initially hesitating, Ronen sets its true face on fire, and then banishes it when it begins to make Litvak's body contort loudly. A flashback reveals that Litvak was the boy forced to shoot the young woman in the opening scene; the pain Litvak felt after the shooting caused the Mazzik to latch on to him.

On the next morning, the mortuary men arrive to collect Litvak's body, and Shulem asks Ronen to attend morning prayers with him; Ronen declines his offer, saying "not today". As he leaves the house, a dark figure (presumably the Mazzik) is seen following Ronen out of the house and heading down the street behind him.

Cast
 Dave Davis as Yakov Ronen
 as Reb Shulem
 Malky Goldman as Sarah
 Fred Melamed as Dr. Kohlberg
 Lynn Cohen as Mrs. Litvak
 Ronald Cohen as Mr. Litvak
 Nati Rabinowitz as Lane
 Moshe Lobel as Lazer
 Lea Kalisch as Adina
 Efraim Miller as Hersch

Release
The Vigil had its world premiere  at the Toronto International Film Festival on September 9, 2019.

The film received a limited theatrical release in the United Kingdom and Ireland in July 2020 through Blumhouse Productions and Vertigo Releasing. It began screening in select theaters in New Zealand on July 16, and was released internationally on August 5, 2020. In October 2020, IFC Midnight acquired the film's distribution rights for the United States and the film was released on February 26, 2021.

Reception

Box office
Upon release in the UK and Ireland, The Vigil grossed £30,302 ($39,500 USD) from 97 sites over its opening weekend.

Critical response
The site's critics consensus reads: "Consistently clever and creepy, The Vigil mines richly atmospheric supernatural horror from a deep well of religious traditions." On Metacritic, the film has a score of 69 out of 100, based on 18 critics, indicating "generally favorable reviews".

Varietys Dennis Harvey gave the film a mostly positive review, calling it an "effectively creepy, small-scale chiller that does a nice job eking suspense from its simple story and limited setting." Eric Kohn of IndieWire gave the film a grade of B, praising Davis's performance and writing that, "even as The Vigil settles into a familiar routine, it tackles that task with a polished, at times even elegant approach to a haunted house formula."

Jordan Mintzer of The Hollywood Reporter wrote that writer-director Keith Thomas "keeps the tension high throughout most of the movie, even if some of his scare tactics can feel redundant", and that he "transforms Orthodox culture into gory material for a slightly elevated horror flick". Phil Hoad of The Guardian gave the film a score of 3 stars out of 5, writing that the film "doesn’t examine rising antisemitism, so it doesn’t have the same contemporary punch as Get Out had regarding Black Lives Matter, or The Invisible Man for #MeToo", but added: "it is all the same an authentically Jewish and reasonably competent chiller." Joe Lipsett of Bloody Disgusting wrote that "The Vigil doesn't exactly break the mould of demonic spirit films, though its sound design, lighting and lead performance certainly make it a solid entry."

Brian Tallerico of RogerEbert.com gave the film a mostly negative review, writing: "Sadly, director Keith Thomas doesn't trust his own themes or visual sense, swallowing his entire film up in abrasive sound design and a reliance on jump scares." Barry Hertz of The Globe and Mail described the film as "the cinematic equivalent of first-timer gefilte fish", adding: "In writer-director Keith Thomas's bid to add a layer of thematic novelty to a familiar genre, he has come up with a mish-mash that will satisfy only those with extremely acquired tastes."

References

External links
 
 

2019 horror films
Dybbuks in film
Films about Orthodox and Hasidic Jews
Blumhouse Productions films
IFC Films films
American drama films
American independent films
Hasidic Judaism in the United States
Yiddish-language films
Films scored by Michael Yezerski
Films directed by Keith Thomas
2019 directorial debut films
2010s American films